Scatterbrain may refer to:
 Scatterbrain (book), by Larry Niven, published in 2003

Music
 Scatterbrain (band), an American band active in the early 1990s
 Scatterbrain (The Xcerts album),2010
 Scatterbrain (KXM album), 2017
 "Scatterbrain", a B-side to "The Final Peace" by Jeff Beck
 "Scatterbrain", a song on Radiohead's 2003 album, Hail to the Thief

Comics
 Scatterbrain (Morituri), a character from the Marvel Comics series Strikeforce Morituri
 Scatterbrain, the original alias used by the Image Comics character Ramjet (Image Comics)
 Scatterbrain, a Marvel UK/Marvel Comics character who used the alias when a member of Technet
 Scatterbrain (Dark Horse Comics), a horror comics anthology from Dark Horse Comics
 Scatterbrain, a limited series from Markosia

Films
 Scatterbrain (film), a 1940 film starring Judy Canova